A supercavitating torpedo is a torpedo using the effect of supercavitation to create a bubble around the torpedo to move at high velocity under water. The following is a list of supercavitating torpedoes which have been developed or are in development.

  VA-111 Shkval
  Hoot
  Superkavitierender Unterwasserlaufkörper (Supercavitating underwater-travelling munition) Barracuda
  (Unnamed Prototype)

References